The I-20 is a modernized version of the M-20. It is a  sloop rigged scow with a spinnaker. The boat was first built at Melges Boat Works, now Melges Performance Sailboats. The boat has two bilgeboards and two small rudders. After a couple years of experimentation, the class settled on its current rules in 2002. The new rules permitted a larger, asymmetrical spinnaker and a carbon fiber rig. It is currently made by Windward Boatworks. In 2005, Melges brought out a new Melges 17 to compete with the I-20.

External links
Official Class Page
ILYA I-20 Page
Windward Boat Works
https://web.archive.org/web/20140819090933/http://ts1.mm.bing.net/th?&id=HN.608047999342677964&w=300&h=300&c=0&pid=1.9&rs=0&p=0

Scows
Dinghies